The Order of the Dragon King (Druk Gyalpo) is the highest decoration of the Kingdom of Bhutan, awarded in recognition of a lifetime of service to the people and Kingdom of Bhutan. Existing in two categories, it is the pinnacle of the honor system in Bhutan and takes precedence over all other orders, decorations and medals. Consisting of two Classes manufactured in sterling silver, the First Class comprises a Breast Star and Sash Badge while the Second Class has only a Sash and Badge.

History 
It was founded on 7 November 2008 by the King Jigme Khesar Namgyel Wangchuck to reward those who have devoted a lifetime of service to the nation and people of Bhutan.

Grades 
The order has two grades :

 First class.
 Second class.

Insignia

General display 
The general display of the order depends on the recipient's dress.

In national Bhutanese dress :
 First class :  a badge from a large neck ribbon and a star from a medal ribbon on the left breast 
 Second class : a badge worn from a large neck ribbon

In European dress or uniform :
 First class :  badge hanging from a sash and a breast star (without ribbon) on the left breast
 Second class : badge hanging from a sash

Details 
The 80mm star consists of a large ornate gold plated back plate with an enameled border centrepiece in orange enamel, and a red enameled center with the Royal Symbol in gold.

The 60mm detachable badge bears the same design as the breast star, with a top suspension device for attaching to the sash.

The ribbon is orange with large white and darker orange border stripes.

Notable recipients 
 
 Queen Grandmother Ashi Kesang Choden (Order of the Druk Gyalpo, First Class).
 Je Thrizur Tenzin Dendup (Order of the Druk Gyalpo, First Class).
 Je Khenpo Trulku Ngawang Jigme Choedra (Order of the Druk Gyalpo, First Class).
 Narendra Modi - Prime Minister of India (Order of the Druk Gyalpo, First Class)

References 

Orders, decorations, and medals of Bhutan
Awards established in 2008
2008 establishments in Bhutan